Callicrates is a crater on Mercury. Its name was adopted by the International Astronomical Union in 1976. Callicrates is named for the Greek architect Callicrates, who lived in the 5th century BCE.

References

Impact craters on Mercury